This is a list of paid daily newspapers in the world by average circulation. Worldwide newspaper circulation figures are compiled by the International Federation of Audit Bureaux of Circulations and World Association of Newspapers and News Publishers. This list shows the latest figures that are publicly available through either organisation.

Some figures are disputed; the numbers for Japanese newspapers have been subjected to claims of "oshigami" (exaggeration by over-supplying papers to businesses). Free newspapers are not counted.

Top newspapers by circulation 
This list below shows paid newspaper dailies by circulation worldwide. The data is compiled from WAN-IFRA's World Press Trends 2016 report.

Historical data 

Worldwide circulation figures for previous years can be seen from WAN-IFRA and IFABC here.

 WAN-IFRA World Press Trends 2014 (Figures available for 2014)

 World Press Trends Database (Figures available from 2010 to 2017)

 IFABC National Newspapers Total Circulation 2013 (Figures available from 2008 to 2012)

See also
 Lists of newspapers
 List of newspapers in Australia by circulation
 List of newspapers in Canada by circulation
 List of newspapers in India by circulation
 List of newspapers in the United Kingdom by circulation
 List of newspapers in the United States
 List of newspapers in Bangladesh by circulation

Notes

References 

 

ja:世界の新聞